Ukamenia is a genus of moths belonging to the subfamily Olethreutinae of the family Tortricidae.

Species
Ukamenia sapporensis (Matsumura, 1931)

See also
List of Tortricidae genera

References

External links
tortricidae.com

Gatesclarkeanini
Tortricidae genera